The 2012 Auburn Tigers football team represented Auburn University in the 2012 NCAA Division I FBS football season. The team was coached by Gene Chizik, who was in his fourth season with Auburn. The Tigers played their home games at Jordan–Hare Stadium in Auburn, Alabama, and competed in the Western Division of the Southeastern Conference (SEC).

On November 25, 2012, Auburn athletic director Jay Jacobs fired head coach Chizik and all of the assistant coaches after finishing the season 3–9 overall with a 0–8 record in SEC play, the program's worst season in 60 years.

Previous season
Auburn finished 2011 with a record of 8–5 (4–4 SEC) and won the Chick-fil-A Bowl over Virginia 43–24. During the month leading up to the bowl game defensive coordinator Ted Roof resigned to take a similar position at Central Florida before ultimately becoming the defensive coordinator at Penn State, and offensive coordinator Gus Malzahn resigned to become the head coach at Arkansas State, but remained with the Tigers through the bowl game.  Star running back Michael Dyer was released from his scholarship and followed Malzahn to Arkansas State after violating undisclosed team rules prior to the bowl game.

Forthcoming season
A shooting at an off campus party killed former players Ed Christian and LaDarius Phillips on June 9 after they had planned to transfer. Current Offensive Guard Eric Mack was also shot but survived, he remains on the team, but has not participated in summer drills. Freshman QB Zeke Pike was arrested for public intoxication and was dismissed from the team. Pike will transfer to Louisville. Other transfers included CB Jonathan Rose and OG Thomas O'Reilly. DE Joel Bonomolo quit the team and linebacker Jawara White suffered a career ending neck injury. Transfers Corey Grant, Mike Blakely and Melvin Ray will be eligible to play this upcoming season.

New coordinators
The Tigers played the 2012 season with new coordinators on both offense and defense.  On offense, Scot Loeffler took control.  Loeffler was previously the offensive coordinator at Temple University, and had served stints as an assistant coach at Michigan, Florida and the Detroit Lions.  While serving as a graduate assistant coach at Michigan, Loeffler tutored future New England Patriots quarterback Tom Brady.

The new Auburn defensive coordinator was Brian VanGorder, who most recently served in a similar capacity with the Atlanta Falcons.  Also new to the Tigers defensive coaching staff was Willie Martinez, who coached defensive backs.  Martinez was previously an assistant coach at Oklahoma.  VanGorder and Martinez previously coached together at Georgia in the early 2000s.  The Tigers switched to a more aggressive blitzing scheme on defense.  The presence of VanGorder on the Tigers’ coaching staff paid dividends in recruiting, as they secured commitments from several high-profile recruits for the 2013 class.

Coaching staff

Returning starters

Offense

Defense

Special teams

Key losses

QB Barrett Trotter
RB Michael Dyer
WR Quindarrius Carr
LT A.J. Greene
RT Brandon Mosely
LB Eltoro Freeman
FS Neiko Thorpe
OC Gus Malzahn
DC Ted Roof

Key returners

QB Kiehl Frazier
QB Clint Moseley
RB Onterio McCalebb
RB Tre Mason
WR Emory Blake
TE Philip Lutzenkirchen
C  Reese Dismukes
LE Corey Lemonier
LE Craig Sanders
LE LaDarius Owens
RE Dee Ford
RE Nosa Equae
DT Jeff Whitaker
LB Daren Bates
CB Chris Davis
CB T'Sharvin Bell
P  Steven Clark
K  Cody Parkey

Depth chart

Offense

Quarterbacks

10 Kiehl Frazier So 6'2 228
15 Clint Moseley Jr 6'4 233
12 Jonathan Wallace Fr 6'2 205

Running backs

23 Onterio McCalebb Sr 5'11 168
21 Tre Mason So 5'10 205
20 Corey Grant So 5'9 203
22 Mike Blakely RFr 5'9 206

Fullbacks

35 Jay Prosch Jr 6'0 253
48 Blake Burgess Jr 6'2 255

 Slot receivers

1 Trovon Reed So 6'0 188
4 Quan Bray So 5'10 175
8 Anthony Morgan Sr 5'9 204

 Wide Receiver

80 Emory Blake Sr 6'2 197
13 Sammie Coates RFr 6'3 210
89 Jaylon Denson So 6'3 208
6  Ricardo Louis Fr 6'2 210

Wide Receiver

85 Travante Stallworth Sr 5'9 195
82 Melvin Ray Fr 6'4 205
87 JaQuay Williams Fr 6'4 201

Tight End

43 Philip Lutzenkirchen Sr 6'4 260
11 Brandon Fulse So 6'5 250
81 C. J. Uzomah So 6'4 246 (was the wildcat last year)
46 Ricky Parks Fr 6'3 237
84 Darrien Hutcherson Fr 6'8 272

 Left Tackle

73 Greg Robinson RFr 6'4 312
72 Shon Coleman RFR 6'6 295
77 Shane Callahan Fr 6'6 285

 Left Guard 

71 John Sullen Sr 6'6 336
63 Alex Kozan Fr 6'4 295
76 Jordan Diamond Fr 6'5 295

Center

50 Reese Dismukes So 6'3 305
65 Tunde Fariyike So 6'3 302

Right Guard

75 Christian Westerman RFr 6'3 310
60 Eric Mack So 6'3 315
70 Robert Leff Fr 6'7 275

 Right Tackle

62 Chad Slade  So 6'5 325
51 Patrick Miller Fr 6'7 275
56 Avery Young Fr 6'6 275
74 Will Adams Fr 6'8 285

Defense

Left End

55 Corey Lemonier Jr 6'4 250
13 Craig Sanders Jr 6'4 266
10 Ladarius Owens So 6'2 257
42 Gimel President Fr 6'4 245

Defensive Tackle

54 Jeff Whitaker Jr 6'5 305
92 Ken Carter Jr 6'4 297
74 Jamar Travis Sr 6'0 294
91 Tyler Nero Fr 6'2 291

Defensive Tackle

90 Gabe Wright So 6'3 305
98 Angelo Blackson So 6'5 325
95 Devaunte Singler So 6'5 295
93 JaBrain Niles RFr 6'2 297

Right End

95 Dee Ford Jr 6'2 245
94 Nosa Equae Jr 6'3 263
52 Justin Delaine So 6'5 250
45 Keymiya Harrell RFr 6'5 260

 Strong Side Linebacker

17 Kris Frost RFr 6'2 233
35 Jonathan Evans 5'11 230
44 Anthony Swain 6'2 245

 Middle Linebacker

5  Jake Holland  Jr 6'1 238
33 Chris Landrum RFr 6'3 233
30 Cassanova McKinzy Fr 6'4 237

 Weak Side Linebacker

25 Daren Bates Sr 5'11 225
26 Justin Garrett So 6'2 206
58 Ashton Richardson Sr 6'1 218
18 Javiere Mitchell Fr 6'2 197

 Left Corner Back

11 Chris Davis Jr 5'10 184
6  Jonathan Mincy So 5'10 188
1  Josh Hoseley Fr 5'9 175
21 Jonathan Jones Fr 5'10 185

 Free Safety 

14 Enrique Florence So 6'1 185
 9 Jermaine Whitehead So 5'11 195
31 Trent Fisher So 6'1 187

 Strong Safety 

12 DeMutruce McNeal Jr 6'2 193
24 Ryan Smith Jr 6'2 208
16 Ikeem Means Sr 6'0 205

 Right Corner Back

22 T'Sharvin Bell Sr 6'0 182
27 Robensen Theirize So 5'8 203
19 Ryan White Jr 5'11 195
28 TJ Davis Fr 6'1 190

Special Teams

K 36 Cody Parkey Jr 6'1 175
P 30 Steven Clarke Jr 6'5 228
LS 59 Jason Lembke Jr 6'2 242
H  19 Ryan White Jr 5'11 195
LS 61 C.T. Moorman Fr 6'1 220
PR 20 Corey Grant So 5'9 203
KR 20 Corey Grant So 5'9 203
KR 4  Quan Bray   So 5'10 175

Team Captains

Emory Blake
Philip Lutzenkirchen
Corey Lemonier

Award Finalists

Maxwell Award- Onterio McCalebb
Doak Walker Award- Onterio McCalebb
Paul Hornung Award-Onterio McCalebb
Johnny Rodgers Award-Onterio McCalebb
Fred Biletnikoff Award- Emory Blake
John Mackey Award-Philip Lutzenkirchen
Dave Rimington Trophy- Reese Dismukes
Chuck Bednarik Award- Corey Lemonier
Bronko Nagurski Trophy-Corey Lemonier
Ted Hendricks Award-Corey Lemonier
Lombardi Award-Corey Lemonier
Butkus Award-Daren Bates
Lou Groza Award-Cody Parkey
Ray Guy Award- Steven Clarke (was finalist last year)

Recruiting class
The main focus in offseason recruiting was adding new offensive linemen.  The Tigers signed seven, led by tackles Avery Young and Jordan Diamond, who were both rated five stars by Scouts.com.  Parade  All-American Shane Callahan and Patrick Miller, both rated as four star recruits, also highlight the recruiting class, as do tackle Will Adams and guard Robert Leff.  The final signee to Auburn’s impressive class of offensive linemen is Alex Kozan, who signed with the Tigers three weeks after the National Signing Day.  In addition, 2010 signee Shon Coleman has been cleared to play after being cured of acute leukemia.  He will have four years of eligibility remaining.

The only high school running back signed was Jovon Robinson; however, he has been unable to practice until potential irregularities in his high school transcripts are resolved.  Three running backs have transferred to the Tigers from other programs: Mike Blakely (Florida), Corey Grant (Alabama) and fullback Jay Prosch (Illinois).

The Tigers added two four-star recruits at wide receiver.  Ricardo Louis signed with Auburn, picking the Tigers over Florida State; also, the Tigers beat out Georgia Tech for the services of JaQuay Williams.  In addition, Melvin Ray transferred from Alabama and will be eligible for the 2013 season.   The Tigers also signed two tight ends: highly regarded Ricky Parks and Darrien Hutchinson, who is 6’8” and weighs 272 pounds.

On defense Auburn concentrated on the secondary, picking up four-star recruit Josh Hosely as well as T.J. Davis and Jonathan Jones.  Defensive line signees include Parade All-American Gimel President and four-star recruit Tyler Nero, who has been timed running a 40-yard dash in 4.62 seconds.  Linebackers Cassanova McKinzy and Javier Mitchell round out the class.

Schedule

Schedule Source:

Game summaries

#14 Clemson

Mississippi State

Louisiana-Monroe

#2 LSU

Arkansas

Ole Miss

Vanderbilt

#20 Texas A&M

New Mexico State

#7 Georgia

Alabama A&M

Alabama

Sources:

In the 2012 edition of the Iron Bowl, Alabama shutout the Auburn Tigers 49–0 at Tuscaloosa. The Crimson Tide opened the game with a 10-play, 75-yard drive that culminated in a two-yard Eddie Lacy touchdown run and a 7–0 lead. After the Alabama defense held Auburn to a three-and-out on their first possession, their offense responded with their second touchdown of the afternoon on a two-yard T. J. Yeldon touchdown run for a 14–0 lead. The Crimson Tide then forced a Tigers' punt on their second possession, and then scored their third touchdown in as many possessions when A. J. McCarron threw a 37-yard pass to Amari Cooper for a 21–0 lead early in the second quarter.

On the Auburn possession that ensued, the Alabama defense collected their first turnover of the game when Robert Lester intercepted a Jonathan Wallace pass at the Tigers' 29-yard line. Five plays later the Crimson Tide led 28–0 after McCarron threw a seven-yard touchdown pass to Kevin Norwood. The Alabama defense held Auburn to their second three-and-out of the game, and then the Crimson Tide scored their fifth touchdown of the game on a one-yard Lacy run for a 35–0 lead. Auburn then committed their second turnover of the game when Nico Johnson forced a Tre Mason fumble that Dee Milliner recovered and returned to the Tigers' 35-yard line. Alabama then took a 42–0 halftime lead when McCarron threw a 29-yard touchdown pass to Cooper.

With the Alabama starters in the game for the first possession of the second half, the defense again held the Tigers to a three-and-out and forced a punt. The offense then made it seven-for-seven on offense when McCarron threw a 38-yard touchdown pass to Norwood for a 49–0 lead. The Alabama defense then did not allow Auburn to get past their own 41-yard line for the duration of the game and secured their fourth shutout of the season. This marked the second consecutive Iron Bowl in which Auburn's offense was unable to score against Alabama's defense. The victory was the second largest in the history of the Iron Bowl after the 55–0 Alabama win in 1948 and improved Alabama's all-time record against the Tigers to 42–34–1.

Rankings

References

Auburn
Auburn Tigers football seasons
Auburn Tigers football